S4716 is an S star located at the center of the Milky Way galaxy orbiting the supermassive blackhole Sgr A* at the speed of 8,000 kilometres per second in closest approach of 100 AU. As of July 2022, the orbital period of S4716 was the shortest known of any star in the Milky Way galaxy. It orbits the Sgr A* in 4.0 years, on an elliptical orbit with an eccentricity of 0.75. Its closest approach to Sgr A* is  15 billion kilometers (about the distance to the space probe Voyager 2 in 2022, or three times the distance of Neptune from the Sun), while its farthest approach is 100 billion kilometers. The star can be detected by NIRC2 (Keck), OSIRIS (Keck), SINFONI (VLT), NACO (VLT) and GRAVITY (VLT).

References 

Milky Way
B-type main-sequence stars
Sagittarius (constellation)